Rolf Gerstenberger was the president of United Steelworkers, Local 1005 at the Hamilton Works of U.S. Steel Canada (formerly Stelco Hilton Works) in Hamilton, Ontario, Canada until his retirement effective 5 May 2015. He is also a prominent member of the Communist Party of Canada (Marxist-Leninist) and president of its electoral arm, the Marxist-Leninist Party of Canada. He was a candidate for the House of Commons of Canada in the 1997 and 2000 Canadian federal elections, running in Hamilton East and Hamilton Mountain, respectively. However he was unsuccessful in getting elected.

Born in Stuttgart, Germany, Gerstenberger first came to Canada from the United States in the late 1960s.  He left the United States because he opposed the Vietnam War. Gerstenberger had worked at Stelco for over forty years, and had worked as a vessel operator in the steel-making division for fifteen years prior to his first election as local union president in April 2003. He holds a Master's degree in theoretical nuclear physics from McMaster University in Hamilton.

On 7 November 2010 US Steel Canada locked out its 900 active employees when the Local 1005 bargaining committee would not agree to the company's demands for major concessions to the pension plan. Several videos featuring Rolf Gerstenberger were posted on YouTube explaining the union's position.

In his final interview with CHCH-TV in Hamilton, he recalled the words of a retired autoworker who said that "although you may be retired from the job, you will never retire from the fight"

References

Year of birth missing (living people)
Living people
Canadian trade unionists
McMaster University alumni
People from Hamilton, Ontario
United Steelworkers people
Communist Party of Canada (Marxist–Leninist) candidates in the 1997 Canadian federal election
Communist Party of Canada (Marxist–Leninist) candidates in the 2000 Canadian federal election